The seventh season of the American sitcom The Big Bang Theory aired on CBS from September 26, 2013 to May 15, 2014.

Kaley Cuoco was credited as "Kaley Cuoco-Sweeting" from "The Convention Conundrum" and onwards after her wedding with Ryan Sweeting on December 31, 2013. Mayim Bialik submitted the episode "The Indecision Amalgamation" for consideration due to her nomination for the Primetime Emmy Award for Outstanding Supporting Actress in a Comedy Series at the 66th Primetime Emmy Awards. Jim Parsons won the Primetime Emmy Award for Outstanding Lead Actor in a Comedy Series at the 66th Primetime Emmy Awards for the episode "The Relationship Diremption". Bob Newhart submitted the episode "The Proton Transmogrification" for consideration due to his nomination for the Primetime Emmy Award for Outstanding Guest Actor in a Comedy Series at the 66th Primetime Creative Arts Emmy Awards. Lucasfilm helped with the creation of the episode.

Production
On March 12, 2014, The Big Bang Theory was renewed for an additional three years, extending it through the 2016–17 season for a total of ten seasons. Production for the seventh season began on August 14, 2013.

Cast

Main cast
 Johnny Galecki as Dr. Leonard Hofstadter
 Jim Parsons as Dr. Sheldon Cooper
 Kaley Cuoco as Penny 
 Simon Helberg as Howard Wolowitz
 Kunal Nayyar as Dr. Rajesh "Raj" Koothrappali
 Mayim Bialik as Dr. Amy Farrah Fowler
 Melissa Rauch as Dr. Bernadette Rostenkowski-Wolowitz

Special guest cast
 Bill Nye as himself
 Ira Flatow as himself
 James Earl Jones as himself 
 Carrie Fisher as herself

Recurring cast
 Regina King as Janine Davis
 Kevin Sussman as Stuart Bloom
 Christine Baranski as  Dr. Beverly Hofstadter
 Bob Newhart as Dr. Arthur Jeffries/Professor Proton
 Kate Micucci as Lucy
 Carol Ann Susi as Mrs. Wolowitz
 Casey Sander as Mike Rostenkowski
 Brian Thomas Smith as Zack Johnson
 Wil Wheaton as himself
 John Ross Bowie as Dr. Barry Kripke
 Laurie Metcalf as Mary Cooper
 Ian Scott Rudolph as Captain Sweatpants
 Michael Massimino as himself
 Laura Spencer as Emily Sweeney
 Brian Posehn as Dr. "Bert" Bertram Kibbler
 Stephen Hawking as himself (voice-over)

Guest cast
 Sophie Oda as Grace
 Aaron Takahashi as a Scientist
 Todd Eric Andrews as Dr. Gunderson
 Morgan Hewitt as Lizzy
 Josh Peck as Jesse
 Tania Raymonde as Yvette
 Christopher Neiman as Dr. Dreyfus
 Kimberly Hebert Gregory as Ms. Davora
 Steve Valentine as Kenneth
 Monica Garcia as Maria

Episodes

Ratings

Reception 
The seventh season received positive reviews. Oliver Sava of The A.V. Club criticized some of the humor, particularly stereotypes written for the female characters, although noting that "these actors make it very funny", but praised the series on a whole; "the major strides made with Sheldon, Penny, and Leonard compensate for some of the more distasteful humor, making this a strong start for this show's seventh season". Carla Day of TV Fanatic wrote that "There were definitely some funny moments, but in its entirety it wasn't one of my favorites". Euan Ferguson of The Guardian wrote that "The Big Bang Theory is now pretty well established ... And just gets ever better".

References 

General references

External links

2013 American television seasons
2014 American television seasons
The Big Bang Theory seasons